Brymbo railway station was a station in Brymbo, Wrexham, Wales. The station was opened on 24 May 1882, closed to passengers on 27 March 1950 and closed completely on 2 November 1964.

References

Further reading

Disused railway stations in Wrexham County Borough
Railway stations in Great Britain opened in 1882
Railway stations in Great Britain closed in 1950
Former Great Western Railway stations
1882 establishments in Wales
1950 disestablishments in Wales